The 1940 Arkansas Razorbacks football team represented the University of Arkansas in the Southwest Conference (SWC) during the 1940 college football season. In their 12th under head coach Fred Thomsen, the Razorbacks compiled a 4–6 record (1–5 against SWC opponents), finished in sixth place in the SWC, and were outscored by their opponents by a combined total of 174 to 112.

Schedule

References

Arkansas
Arkansas Razorbacks football seasons
Arkansas Razorbacks football